The women's shot put competition at the 2012 Summer Olympics in London, United Kingdom was held at the Olympic Stadium on 6 August.

Summary
Each athlete received three throws in the qualifying round. All who achieved the qualifying distance progressed to the final. If less than twelve athletes would achieve this mark, then the twelve furthest throwing athletes would reach the final. Each finalist was allowed three throws in last round, with the top eight athletes after that point being given three further attempts.

In the finals, Valerie Adams, the defending champion, took the lead in the first throw, but Nadzeya Ostapchuk, who was third in the 2008 Olympic competition, overtook the lead in the second throw and remained the leader until the end of the competition. Gong Lijiao remained third until the last throw, when she was overtaken by Yevgeniya Kolodko. The 2008 silver medalist, Natallia Mikhnevich, qualified for the final, but remained in last place.

On 13 August 2012, IOC announced that Nadzeya Ostapchuk had tested positive for metenolone both before and after winning the shot put event.  She was formally expelled from the games and her victory and medal removed from the records. The gold medal was then awarded to Valerie Adams, the silver to Yevgeniya Kolodko, and the bronze to Gong Lijiao.

On 20 August 2016, the IOC announced Yevgeniya Kolodko, the Russian silver medalist, failed anti-doping test and her silver medal was stripped.  Gong Lijiao ended up with the silver instead and a compatriot, Li Ling was upgraded to the bronze medal.

Schedule
All times are British Summer Time (UTC+1)

Records
, the existing World and Olympic records were as follows.

Results

Qualifying round
Qual. rule: qualification standard 18.90m (Q) or at least best 12 qualified (q).

Notes: Nadzeya Ostapchuk would originally qualify first, with the longest throw, and had taken part in the Final as such. Due to her doping violations, these results were annulled in August 2012. Yevgeniya Kolodko would originally qualify third, with the third longest throw, and had taken part in the Final as such. Due to her doping violations, these results were annulled in August 2016. Irina Tarasova originally qualified in seventh place; her results were annulled by the Athletics Integrity Unit in August 2022.

Final

Notes: Nadzeya Ostapchuk, Yevgeniya Kolodko and Irina Tarasova originally placed first, third and ninth, respectively, but had these results annulled due to doping violations.

References

Athletics at the 2012 Summer Olympics
Shot put at the Olympics
2012 in women's athletics
Women's events at the 2012 Summer Olympics